Neven (Cyrillic script: Невен) is a Slavic masculine given name, it is the masculine form of the feminine Slavic name, Nevena.

People named Neven:
Neven Jurica (born 1952), Croatian politician
Neven Maguire (born 1974), Irish celebrity chef and television personality
Neven Marković (born 1987), Bosnian Serb football player
Neven Mimica (born 1953), Croatian politician and diplomat
Neven Pajkić (born 1977), Bosnian-Canadian heavyweight boxer
Neven Sesardić (born 1949), Croatian philosopher
Neven Spahija (born 1962), Croatian basketball head coach
Neven Subotić (born 1988), Serbian football defender
Neven Venkov (born 1982), Bulgarian football midfielder
Neven Vukman (born 1985), Croatian football midfielder
Neven Žugaj (born 1983), Croatian male wrestler

Slavic masculine given names
Bulgarian masculine given names
Croatian masculine given names
Serbian masculine given names
Slovene masculine given names
Macedonian masculine given names
Ukrainian masculine given names